ECI is a provider of managed services, cyber security and business transformation for mid-market financial services organizations across the globe. The firm was founded when Eze Castle Consulting split into two independent entities. It employs 900 plus people, with offices in Singapore, Europe, Hong Kong, India and nine US locations.

History
Sean McLaughlin and John Cahaly founded Eze Castle Consulting in 1995. McLaughlin previously worked at several investment firms. The company was named after Èze, a village in the French Riviera. Eze Castle Consulting began supporting early stage funds in the Boston area, then opened up new offices in New York City, San Francisco and Greenwich, Connecticut in the late-1990s.

As of 2017, Eze Castle had a major office in an 18,000 square foot space at 529 Fifth Avenue in Manhattan, where they had been located since 2005.
In 2000, Eze Castle Consulting was split into two independent companies, Eze Castle Software and Eze Castle Integration; Eze Castle Integration became a systems integration company focused on the financial services sector. During the economic downturn in 2000, the firm downsized and reduced many expenditures while continuing to generate a profit. By 2004 the company had grown to a 120-person staff. Throughout the late 2000s, the company introduced Eze Vault, Eze Disaster Recovery, ECI Link and Eze Managed Suites. They also introduced Eze Cloud and started selling Tradar's Insight product in a hosted cloud model. Today a growing percentage of  the firm's revenue comes from cloud-based products.

In the first eight months of 2008 the average hedge fund declined five percent and 170 hedge funds closed their doors due to ongoing financial volatility. Although 95 percent of the firm's  clients were hedge funds, it experienced a revenue increase of 26 percent and obtained sixty new clients during the time period.

At the time, the company supported 450 US-based hedge funds, including 81 firms with over $1 billion in management. It opened new offices in Chicago in 2008, and London in 2007. In 2010 and 2011 new offices were opened in Singapore and Hong Kong. In 2010 an affiliate company, Ledgex Systems LLC, was created to develop and support software for fund of hedge funds to automate and manage investment portfolios.

In 2018, the company received a significant investment from private equity firm H.I.G. Capital. At the time, Eze Castle had roughly 650 customers across the United States, United Kingdom and Asia.

In 2020, Eze Castle Integration acquired Alphaserve Technologies, a provider of infrastructure technology and digital IT services, bringing the company's client base to 800. In November 2020 the company acquired digital transformation firm NorthOut, Inc. The acquisition accelerates Eze Castle Integration's digital transformation offering for the financial and professional services industries. The acquisitions bring the company's client base to over 800 clients globally.

In 2021, Eze Castle Integration rebranded as ECI to reflect industry leading managed services for financial firms. The company has also unveiled the biggest, broadest portfolio of managed services in the industry, including business transformation as a service. This was made possible by the successful integration of two strategic acquisitions, undertaken by ECI to keep pace with increased demand and enhance its long-held leadership position in serving mid-market financial organizations.

Products & services
ECI provides IT infrastructure and technology services to financial firms across the globe. With the integration of the acquisitions completed, ECI's new portfolio is broken into three pillars that cover a broad range of services, including:

 Managed Services: Cloud solutions, networking and hardware, IT support. 
 Cybersecurity: Managed services for security information and event management (SIEM), operations centers, dark web monitoring, phishing and threat training, vulnerability assessments and remediation, governance and risk management, Chief Information Security Officer (CISO) as a service. 
 Business Transformation: Cloud, application development, DevOps, process automation, managed data services, strategic advisory, distributed workforce enablement.

References

Financial software companies
Information technology consulting firms of the United States
Technology companies based in the Boston area
Software companies based in Massachusetts
Software companies established in 1995
Software companies of the United States